Antonio Dell'Aquila (born 20 December 1957) is an Italian rower. He competed at the 1980 Summer Olympics and the 1984 Summer Olympics.

References

External links
 

1957 births
Living people
Italian male rowers
Olympic rowers of Italy
Rowers at the 1980 Summer Olympics
Rowers at the 1984 Summer Olympics
People from Ottaviano
Sportspeople from the Province of Naples